The American Electric Piranha (also named Blair-American USA or American USA) was a prototype American counter-insurgency aircraft. Designed by Milt Blair and Dick Ennis in the early 1960s, it was built by the American Electric Corporation.

Developed for use by the  United States Air Force under Project Little Brother, initial flight testing of the Piranha took place at Mojave Airport in California; following delivery for evaluation, it was tested at Eglin Air Force Base in Florida. The design armament of the Piranha was two pods each carrying four Zuni unguided rockets, mounted on the aircraft's wingtips, and a single  bomb on a belly hardpoint.

Evaluation of the Piranha ceased following the death of Milt Blair in an unrelated aircraft accident. The prototype, N1518, is flown by a private owner in Kansas.

Specifications

See also

References

American Electric aircraft
1960s United States attack aircraft
Single-engined tractor aircraft
Mid-wing aircraft
Cancelled military aircraft projects of the United States
Aircraft first flown in 1966